Rensselaer may refer to:

Places
Rensselaer, Indiana, a city
Rensselaer (Amtrak station), serving the city
Rensselaer, Missouri, a village
Rensselaer County, New York
Rensselaer, New York, a city in Rensselaer County
Rensselaer Falls, New York, a village in St. Lawrence County
Rensselaerville, New York, a town in Albany County
Manor of Rensselaerswyck, the Van Rensselaer family's estate during colonial times

People
 Van Rensselaer (surname)
 Rensselaer Morse Lewis (1820-1888), Wisconsin state legislator
 Rensselaer Nelson (1826-1904), U.S. federal judge
 Rensselaer Westerlo (1776–1851), U.S. Congressman from New York
 Bret Rensselaer, an American-born, British spy in the Bernard Samson novels

Other
 Rensselaer Polytechnic Institute, a university in Troy, New York

See also 
 Van Rensselaer (disambiguation)